Siegfried is a masculine German given name.

Siegfried may also refer to:

 Siegfried (opera) (1876), an opera by Richard Wagner
 Siegfried (play) (1928), a play by Jean Giraudoux
 Siegfried-class coastal defense ship of the German Imperial Navy
 , the lead ship of the class
 Siegfried Line, German defensive lines in World War I and World War II; the Germans themselves called the World War II line the Westwall
 Siegfried (band), a heavy metal band from Austria featuring singer Sandra Schleret
 Siegfried & Roy, magicians
 Siegfried Creek, a stream in Minnesota
 Wolf pack Siegfried, a wolf pack of German U-boats that operated during the Battle of the Atlantic
 The Siegfried, a type of Knightmare Frame piloted by Jeremiah Gottwald in Code Geass
 Siegfried Hall (University of Notre Dame), a residence hall at the University of Notre Dame
 "Seigfried", a song from Frank Ocean's 2016 album Blonde

See also
 Karl E. H. Seigfried, musician
 Seigfried (disambiguation)
 Sigurd (disambiguation)
 Walter Siegfried, performer